Ecological engineering uses ecology and engineering to predict, design, construct or restore, and manage ecosystems that integrate "human society with its natural environment for the benefit of both".

Origins, key concepts, definitions, and applications 
Ecological engineering emerged as a new idea in the early 1960s, but its definition has taken several decades to refine, its implementation is still undergoing adjustment, and its broader recognition as a new paradigm is relatively recent. Ecological engineering was introduced by Howard Odum and others as utilizing natural energy sources as the predominant input to manipulate and control environmental systems. The origins of ecological engineering are in Odum's work with ecological modeling and ecosystem simulation to capture holistic macro-patterns of energy and material flows affecting the efficient use of resources.

Mitsch and Jorgensen summarized five basic concepts that differentiate ecological engineering from other approaches to addressing problems to benefit society and nature: 1) it is based on the self-designing capacity of ecosystems; 2) it can be the field (or acid) test of ecological theories; 3) it relies on system approaches; 4) it conserves non-renewable energy sources; and 5) it supports ecosystem and biological conservation.

Mitsch and Jorgensen were the first to define ecological engineering as designing societal services such that they benefit society and nature, and later noted the design should be systems based, sustainable, and integrate society with its natural environment.

Bergen et al. defined ecological engineering as: 1) utilizing ecological science and theory; 2) applying to all types of ecosystems; 3) adapting engineering design methods; and 4) acknowledging a guiding value system.

Barrett (1999) offers a more literal definition of the term: "the design, construction, operation and management (that is, engineering) of landscape/aquatic structures and associated plant and animal communities (that is, ecosystems) to benefit humanity and, often, nature." Barrett continues: "other terms with equivalent or similar meanings include ecotechnology and two terms most often used in the erosion control field: soil bioengineering and biotechnical engineering.  However, ecological engineering should not be confused with 'biotechnology' when describing genetic engineering at the cellular level, or 'bioengineering' meaning construction of artificial body parts."

The applications in ecological engineering can be classified into 3 spatial scales: 1) mesocosms (~0.1 to hundreds of meters); 2) ecosystems (~one to tens of km); and 3) regional systems (>tens of km). The complexity of the design likely increases with the spatial scale. Applications are increasing in breadth and depth, and likely impacting the field's definition, as more opportunities to design and use ecosystems as interfaces between society and nature are explored. Implementation of ecological engineering has focused on the creation or restoration of ecosystems, from degraded wetlands to multi-celled tubs and greenhouses that integrate microbial, fish, and plant services to process human wastewater into products such as fertilizers, flowers, and drinking water. Applications of ecological engineering in cities have emerged from collaboration with other fields such as landscape architecture, urban planning, and urban horticulture, to address human health and biodiversity, as targeted by the UN Sustainable Development Goals, with holistic projects such as stormwater management. Applications of ecological engineering in rural landscapes have included wetland treatment and community reforestation through traditional ecological knowledge. Permaculture is an example of broader applications that have emerged as distinct disciplines from ecological engineering, where David Holmgren cites the influence of Howard Odum in development of permaculture.

Design guidelines, functional classes, and design principles 
Ecological engineering design will combine systems ecology with the process of engineering design. Engineering design typically involves problem formulation (goal), problem analysis (constraints), alternative solutions search, decision among alternatives, and specification of a complete solution. A temporal design framework is provided by Matlock et al., stating the design solutions are considered in ecological time. In selecting between alternatives, the design should incorporate ecological economics in design evaluation and acknowledge a guiding value system which promotes biological conservation, benefiting society and nature.

Ecological engineering utilizes systems ecology with engineering design to obtain a holistic view of the interactions within and between society and nature. Ecosystem simulation with Energy Systems Language (also known as energy circuit language or energese) by Howard Odum is one illustration of this systems ecology approach. This holistic model development and simulation defines the system of interest, identifies the system's boundary, and diagrams how energy and material moves into, within, and out of, a system in order to identify how to use renewable resources through ecosystem processes and increase sustainability. The system it describes is a collection (i.e., group) of components (i.e., parts), connected by some type of interaction or interrelationship, that collectively responds to some stimulus or demand and fulfills some specific purpose or function. By understanding systems ecology the ecological engineer can more efficiently design with ecosystem components and processes within the design, utilize renewable energy and resources, and increase sustainability.

Mitsch and Jorgensen identified five Functional Classes for ecological engineering designs:
 Ecosystem utilized to reduce/solve pollution problem. Example: phytoremediation, wastewater wetland, and bioretention of stormwater to filter excess nutrients and metals pollution
 Ecosystem imitated or copied to address resource problem. Example: forest restoration, replacement wetlands, and installing street side rain gardens to extend canopy cover to optimize residential and urban cooling
 Ecosystem recovered after disturbance. Example: mine land restoration, lake restoration, and channel aquatic restoration with mature riparian corridors
 Ecosystem modified in ecologically sound way. Example: selective timber harvest, biomanipulation, and introduction of predator fish to reduce planktivorous fish, increase zooplankton, consume algae or phytoplankton, and clarify the water.
 Ecosystems used for benefit without destroying balance. Example: sustainable agro-ecosystems, multispecies aquaculture, and introducing agroforestry plots into residential property to generate primary production at multiple vertical levels.

Mitsch and Jorgensen identified 19 Design Principles for ecological engineering, yet not all are expected to contribute to any single design:
 Ecosystem structure & function are determined by forcing functions of the system;
 Energy inputs to the ecosystems and available storage of the ecosystem is limited;
 Ecosystems are open and dissipative systems (not thermodynamic balance of energy, matter, entropy, but spontaneous appearance of complex, chaotic structure);
 Attention to a limited number of governing/controlling factors is most strategic in preventing pollution or restoring ecosystems;
 Ecosystem have some homeostatic capability that results in smoothing out and depressing the effects of strongly variable inputs;
 Match recycling pathways to the rates of ecosystems and reduce pollution effects;
 Design for pulsing systems wherever possible;
 Ecosystems are self-designing systems;
 Processes of ecosystems have characteristic time and space scales that should be accounted for in environmental management;
 Biodiversity should be championed to maintain an ecosystem's self design capacity;
 Ecotones, transition zones, are as important for ecosystems as membranes for cells; 
 Coupling between ecosystems should be utilized wherever possible;
 The components of an ecosystem are interconnected, interrelated, and form a network; consider direct as well as indirect efforts of ecosystem development;
 An ecosystem has a history of development;
 Ecosystems and species are most vulnerable at their geographical edges;
 Ecosystems are hierarchical systems and are parts of a larger landscape;
 Physical and biological processes are interactive, it is important to know both physical and biological interactions and to interpret them properly;
 Eco-technology requires a holistic approach that integrates all interacting parts and processes as far as possible;
 Information in ecosystems is stored in structures.

Mitsch and Jorgensen identified the following considerations prior implementing an ecological engineering design: 
 Create conceptual model of determine the parts of nature connected to the project;
 Implement a computer model to simulate the impacts and uncertainty of the project;
 Optimize the project to reduce uncertainty and increase beneficial impacts.

Academic curriculum (colleges)
An academic curriculum has been proposed for ecological engineering, and institutions around the world are starting programs. Key elements of this curriculum are: environmental engineering; systems ecology; restoration ecology; ecological modeling; quantitative ecology; economics of ecological engineering, and technical electives.

Complementing this set of courses are prerequisites courses in physical, biological, and chemical subject areas, and integrated design experiences. According to Matlock et al., the design should identify constraints, characterize solutions in ecological time, and incorporate ecological economics in design evaluation. Economics of ecological engineering has been demonstrated using energy principles for a wetland., and using nutrient valuation for a dairy farm <ref>C. Pizarro and others, An Economic Assessment of Algal Turf Scrubber Technology for Treatment of Dairy Manure Effluent. Ecological Engineering, 26(12): 321-327.</ref>

 See also 

 Afforestation
 Agroecology 
 Agroforestry
 Analog forestry
 Biomass (ecology)
 Buffer strip
 Constructed wetland
 Energy-efficient landscaping
 Environmental engineering
 Forest farming
 Forest gardening
 Great Green Wall
 Great Plains Shelterbelt (1934- )
 Great Plan for the Transformation of Nature - an example of applied ecological engineering in the 1940s and 1950s
 Hedgerow
 Home gardens
 Human ecology
 Macro-engineering
 Sand fence
 Seawater greenhouse
 Sustainable agriculture
 Terra preta
 Three-North Shelter Forest Program
 Wildcrafting
 Windbreak

 Literature 
 Howard T. Odum (1963), "Man and Ecosystem" Proceedings, Lockwood Conference on the Suburban Forest and Ecology, in: Bulletin Connecticut Agric. Station.
 
 W.J. Mitsch (1993), Ecological engineering—"a cooperative role with the planetary life–support systems. Environmental Science & Technology''  27:438-445.
 
 
 
 H.D. van Bohemen (2004), Ecological Engineering and Civil Engineering works, Doctoral thesis TU Delft, The Netherlands.

References

External links
 What is "ecological engineering"? Webtext, Ecological Engineering Group, 2007.
 Ecological Engineering Student Society Website, EESS, Oregon State University, 2011.
 Ecological Engineering webtext by Howard T.Odum Center for Wetlands at the University of Florida, 2007.

Organizations
 American Ecological Engineering Society, homepage.
 Ecological Engineering Student Society Website, EESS, Oregon State University, 2011.
 American Society of Professional Wetland Engineers, homepage, wiki.
 Ecological Engineering Group, homepage.
 International Ecological Engineering Society homepage.

Scientific journals
 Ecological Engineering since 1992, with a general description of the field.
 Landscape and Ecological Engineering since 2005.
 Journal of Ecological Engineering Design Officially launched in 2021, this journal offers a diamond open access format (free to the reader, free to the authors). This is the official journal of the American Ecological Engineering Society with production support from the University of Vermont Libraries.

Ecological restoration
Environmental terminology
Environmental engineering
Environmental social science
Engineering disciplines
Climate change policy